Tomiko Brown-Nagin (born c. 1970) is an American law professor, historian, author, and university leader. She is dean of Harvard Radcliffe Institute, one of the world’s leading centers for interdisciplinary research across the humanities, sciences, social sciences, arts, and professions. She is also the Daniel P.S. Paul Professor of Constitutional Law at Harvard Law School and a Harvard University professor of history.

Early life and education
Brown-Nagin was born circa 1970. She graduated from Furman University, where she was named a Truman Scholar and graduated summa cum laude with a bachelor of arts degree in history in 1992. She earned a J.D. from Yale Law School, where she served as an editor of the Yale Law Journal, in 1997, and a Ph.D in history from Duke University in 2002.

Career
Brown-Nagin clerked for Robert L. Carter of the U.S. District Court, Southern District of New York, and for Jane Roth of the U.S. Court of Appeals for the Third Circuit. She began her career as a lawyer in private practice at Paul, Weiss, Rifkind, Wharton & Garrison in New York, and then held the Charles Hamilton Houston Fellowship at Harvard Law School and a Golieb legal history fellowship at New York University. Brown-Nagin was the T. Munford Boyd Professor of Law and Justice Thurgood Marshall Distinguished Professor of Law at the University of Virginia Law School.

In 2018, Brown-Nagin assumed the role as dean of Harvard Radcliffe Institute, one of the world’s leading centers for interdisciplinary research across the humanities, sciences, social sciences, arts, and professions. She is also the Daniel P.S. Paul Professor of Constitutional Law at Harvard Law School and a professor of history at Harvard University.  She has written about constitutional law and alleged inequality and has called on selective institutions of higher education to admit and financially support greater numbers of students who are the first in their families to attend college.

In 2011, Brown-Nagin published Courage to Dissent: Atlanta and the Long History of the Civil Rights Movement, which won the 2012 Bancroft Prize in history, the Liberty Legacy Award from the Organization of American Historians, the John Phillip Reid Book Award from the American Society for Legal History, the Charles Sydnor Award from the Southern Historical Association, the Lillian Smith Book Award from the Southern Regional Council, and the Hurston/Wright Legacy Award in the category of non-fiction.

In 2020, she was selected as a fellow of the American Academy of Arts and Sciences. In 2022, Brown-Nagin published Civil Rights Queen: Constance Baker Motley and the Struggle for Equality, which received praise from New York Times, Washington Post, and several esteemed authors. It also has been featured by NPR, PBS, and Harvard Magazine.

In 2022, she was the recipient of the Graduate School of Duke University's distinguished alumni award.

Personal life
In 1998, Brown-Nagin married Daniel L. Nagin, a Harvard Law School professor.

Publications
 Civil Rights Queen: Constance Baker Motley and the Struggle for Equality (Pantheon Books 2022) 
 "Constance Baker Motley Taught the Nation How to Win Justice", 2022 Smithsonian Magazine
 "Rethinking Proxies for Economic Disadvantage in Higher Education", 2014 U. Chicago Legal Forum.
 "Two Americas in Healthcare: Federalism and Wars over Poverty from the New Deal-Great Society to Obamacare," 62 Drake L. Review (2014).
 "The Diversity Paradox: Judicial Review in an Age of Demographic and Educational Change" 65 Vanderbilt Law Review En Banc 113 (2012)
 Courage to Dissent: Atlanta and the Long History of the Civil Rights Movement (Oxford University Press 2011).
 "Elites, Social Movements, and the Law: The Case of Affirmative Action", 105 Columbia Law Review 1436 (2005).
 "Race as Identity Caricature: A Local Legal History Lesson in the Salience of Intra-Racial Conflict", 151 University of Pennsylvania Law Review 1913 (2003).

References

External links
Official page at Harvard

Living people
1970s births
20th-century African-American people
20th-century African-American women
21st-century African-American people
21st-century African-American women
African-American academics
African-American lawyers
African-American women lawyers
American university and college faculty deans
American women academics
American women lawyers
American lawyers
Bancroft Prize winners
Duke University alumni
Fellows of the American Academy of Arts and Sciences
Furman University alumni
Harvard Law School faculty
Members of the American Philosophical Society
Paul, Weiss, Rifkind, Wharton & Garrison people
University of Virginia School of Law faculty
Women deans (academic)
American women legal scholars
American legal scholars
Yale Law School alumni